Scott Benjamin Laird (born 15 May 1988) is an English professional footballer who plays as a left back and midfielder for Southern League Premier Division South club Weston-super-Mare. He is also the club's assistant manager.

Laird began his football career as a trainee at Plymouth Argyle, progressing through the club's centre of excellence. He spent eight years at Plymouth, making one first-team appearance for the club. In 2006, he was loaned out to Tiverton Town, scoring four goals in 20 games during his time there. He was later loaned to Torquay United in September 2007, making two appearances for the team. Another loan spell followed, this time to Stevenage Borough of the Conference Premier in late 2007. After playing regularly during the loan agreement, he signed for Stevenage on a permanent basis in February 2008. During his five years with Stevenage, where he played 245 times in all competitions, Laird helped the club earn back-to-back promotions from the Conference Premier to League One. He was named the club's Player of the Year for the 2009–10 season.

He left Stevenage when his contract expired in 2012, and signed for Preston North End. He spent three years at Preston, culminating in promotion to the Championship during the 2014–15 season. Laird joined League One club Scunthorpe United in June 2015, spending the 2016–17 season on loan at Walsall. In June 2017, he signed for Forest Green Rovers, rejoining Walsall on loan in January 2019 for the remainder of the 2018–19 season. He left Forest Green in May 2019 and signed for Weston-super-Mare in a player-assistant manager role a month later. Laird also represented Scotland at youth level, captaining the under-16 team all the way up to under-20 level. He was selected for the England C team in April 2009, earning one cap.

Early life
Laird was born in Taunton, Somerset, and grew up in Bridgwater. He supported Rangers and Ipswich Town as a boy, and singled out Brian Laudrup as a player he always aspired to play like. Laird played football at East Bridgwater School aged nine, which was a satellite centre for Plymouth Argyle.

Club career

Early career
At the age of 14, Laird progressed to Plymouth Argyle's centre of excellence in Ivybridge. He made the one hour journey from his Bridgwater home to train with the club every Tuesday and Thursday. During this time, he played as a left-sided centre-back. Laird attracted interest from Rangers in 2003, with the SPL club enquiring about the player after his performances for Scotland in the Victory Shield. No move materialised, and he continued to progress through the youth system at Home Park. He signed an academy scholarship with the club aged 16, before being offered a two-year professional contract at the age of 17 by manager Tony Pulis in February 2006, which he signed. During his time as an apprentice, Laird lived in a hotel "just for apprentices" with Luke Summerfield, Reuben Reid, and Chris Zebroski, and described the experience as a "great way to grow into football".

The following season, Laird joined Tiverton Town of the Southern Football League on an initial one-month loan on 8 September 2006. He made his debut for the club in Tiverton's 2–1 victory against Wealdstone a day after signing. The loan agreement was extended for a further five months, and Laird scored his first goal for the club in a 4–1 defeat at Hemel Hempstead Town on 5 April 2007. Two days later, he scored twice in Tiverton's 3–1 home win against Cirencester Town, scoring both of his goals in the space of four minutes to give Tiverton a two-goal lead. Laird played 21 games for Tiverton during the loan spell, of which 17 were in the league, as he scored four times from a central midfield role. Laird returned to Plymouth ahead of the 2007–08 season, and was subsequently handed his Plymouth debut in a 2–1 victory over Wycombe Wanderers in the League Cup on 14 August 2007, playing the whole match, where he provided the assist for Plymouth's second goal. He did not appear for Plymouth again and was loaned out to nearby Conference Premier club Torquay United a month later. Laird made his Torquay debut in a 5–2 victory against Kidderminster Harriers at Aggborough on 22 September 2007. Although his loan at Torquay was extended on 16 November 2007, he did not make any more first-team appearances for the club, playing just twice for Torquay during the two-month loan spell.

Stevenage
A month after returning to his parent club, Laird was loaned out to another Conference Premier team in the form of Stevenage Borough on 31 December 2007. He made his Stevenage debut a day later in a 2–1 win over Rushden & Diamonds. Laird impressed under manager Peter Taylor and signed on a permanent basis on 1 February 2008, for an undisclosed fee. He played regularly at left-back during the second half of the 2007–08 season, scoring his first goal for Stevenage in a 4–1 victory away at Histon on 4 March 2008, a 35-yard strike into the top right hand corner of the goal. The following season, under the new management of Graham Westley, Laird played 51 games for the Hertfordshire club, scoring three times. Laird scored his first goal of the 2008–09 season in Stevenage's first win of the season; a 3–1 victory away to Barrow on 30 August 2008. Laird was also a regular in the team's FA Trophy campaign that season, playing in six FA Trophy matches. He missed the final at Wembley Stadium as a result of being sent-off in the defeat to Cambridge United in the Conference Premier play-off semi-final. In his absence, Stevenage beat York City 2–0 in the FA Trophy final.

Laird continued to be the club's first-choice left-back throughout the 2009–10 season. He scored his first goal of the season in a 2–0 victory over Histon at Bridge Road on 31 August 2009. He also scored the winning goal with an 85th-minute strike against local rivals Luton Town, securing a 1–0 victory at Kenilworth Road in the first ever league meeting between the two clubs.  His second-half penalty gave Stevenage a 1–0 victory over second-placed Oxford United on 30 March 2010; meaning Stevenage moved eight points clear of Oxford at the top of the Conference Premier league table. Laird made 53 appearances as Stevenage won promotion to the Football League for the first time in their history. The appearance tally was more than any other player for the club during the season, scoring six goals. He was voted as Stevenage's Player of the Year at the end of the season. Upon the conclusion of the season, Laird signed a new two-year contract extension with the Hertfordshire club in May 2010. He was voted as the 2009–10 Young Player of the Year at the National Game Awards. At the Football Conference's Annual Presentation Dinner, Laird was also named in the Team of the Year, alongside fellow Stevenage defenders Ronnie Henry and Mark Roberts.

He started in the club's first ever Football League match at the start of the 2010–11 season, a 2–2 home draw with Macclesfield Town on 7 August 2010. He scored his first goal of the season in a 2–1 victory against Burton Albion on 16 October 2010. At the age of 22, Laird captained Stevenage for the first time in their 1–0 loss to Hereford United on 8 March 2011. He played 54 games during the 2010–11 season, scoring four goals. This included three appearances in the 2010–11 League Two play-offs following Stevenage's sixth-placed finish. Stevenage earned promotion to League One after a 1–0 win against Torquay United at Old Trafford on 28 May 2011, with Laird playing the whole game. Laird's performances in the opening months of the 2011–12 season resulted in a "number of Championship clubs tracking the player". He finished as the club's second highest goalscorer for the season in their first season in League One, as Stevenage missed out on a third successive promotion following a play-off semi-final defeat. At the end of the season, Laird rejected an improved contract offer and left the club on a free transfer when his contract expired. Laird made 245 appearances during his four years with the club, scoring 24 goals.

Preston North End
Laird subsequently signed for League One club Preston North End on a free transfer on 27 May 2012. The move reunited Laird with manager Graham Westley, who he had been previously managed by at Stevenage. He made his Preston debut in the club's first game of the 2012–13 season, playing the whole match in 2–0 home win over Huddersfield Town in the League Cup on 13 August 2012. Laird scored his first goals for the club in a 5–0 win against Hartlepool United at Deepdale on 18 September 2012, scoring twice within the space of three second-half minutes. Described as Preston's "standout performer" in the opening months of the season having scored four times and assisted seven goals from left-back, Laird suffered a broken leg following a challenge from Jamal Campbell-Ryce in a home game against Notts County on 20 November 2012. It was later revealed that Laird had broken his left tibia and would miss the remainder of the season. During his recovery, Laird stated that Campbell-Ryce rang him on a weekly basis – "I knew him previously and he's rung me every week to make sure I'm alright. I'm not one to hold grudges anyway and he's been fine. I accept his apology". Laird scored four times in 24 games during his first season with the club.

A year-and-a-half after his sustaining his broken leg, Laird returned to the Preston first-team at the start of the 2013–14 season, making his first appearance back when he appeared as a 74th-minute substitute in a 0–0 draw away at Rotherham United on 10 August 2013. He scored his only goal of the season against his former employers, Stevenage, scoring Preston's second goal in a 3–0 win at Deepdale on 14 September 2013. Laird signed a twelve-month contract extension on 17 December 2013, keeping him contracted to the club until the summer of 2015. He made 42 appearances during the season, scoring once, as Preston missed out on promotion back to the Championship after losing in the play-off semi-finals to Rotherham United.

Laird remained at Preston for the 2014–15 season and was once again a regular at left-back during the season. He scored his first goal of the season in a 2–2 draw with Oldham Athletic in the Football League Trophy on 25 November 2014, courtesy of a diving header from ten yards out to open the scoring. Laird scored in Preston's 3–1 home defeat to Manchester United in the FA Cup on 16 February 2015, briefly giving Preston the lead when his left-footed shot found the net just after half-time. He played in all three of the club's play-off matches at the end of the season, including in Preston's 4–0 win over Swindon Town in the final at Wembley Stadium to gain promotion back to the Championship after a four-year absence. At the end of the season, Laird rejected the offer a new contract at Preston, stating – "maybe I felt I would be pushed down the pecking order, maybe I felt I wouldn't have played as often. "There are no hard feelings, the management team have been brilliant to work with". Laird made 108 appearances during his three-year spell at Preston, scoring seven times.

Scunthorpe United
Following his departure from Preston, Laird signed for League One club Scunthorpe United on 11 June 2015, joining on a free transfer and on a three-year deal. He made his Scunthorpe debut on the opening day of the 2015–16 season, playing the whole match in a 2–1 defeat away to Burton Albion. Laird scored his first goal for Scunthorpe in a 2–1 victory over Shrewsbury Town on 17 October 2015, his header just before the hour mark restoring parity in the match after Scunthorpe had trailed in the first-half. Three days later, on 20 October 2015, he met Scott Wiseman's cross with "a powerful left-footed shot" to give Scunthorpe the lead in an eventual 2–1 defeat to Gillingham. He made 38 appearances in all competitions that season, scoring twice, as Scunthorpe missed out on the League One play-offs after finishing in seventh position.

Laird did not feature in the majority of Scunthorpe's matches at the start of the 2016–17 season, an 85th-minute substitute appearance in a 5–0 home victory against Gillingham served as his only appearance in the opening month of the season. Having found himself out of favour at Scunthorpe, Laird joined fellow League One club Walsall on loan on 31 August 2016, with the loan agreement initially running until January 2017. He made his Walsall debut in a 2–0 away defeat to Northampton Town on 10 September 2016. Laird scored his first goal for Walsall in a 2–1 away victory over Sheffield United in an EFL Trophy tie on 4 October 2016. His loan deal was extended upon its expiry in January 2017, the new deal running until the end of the season, with Laird stating he was "absolutely delighted" with signing the extension. He added a fourth goal to his season's tally when he scored the winning goal in Walsall's 1–0 victory over Chesterfield at the Bescot Stadium on 7 March 2017. He made 31 appearances during the loan spell, scoring four goals. Upon his return to Scunthorpe at the end of the season, Laird's contract was terminated by mutual consent in June 2017.

Forest Green Rovers
After leaving Scunthorpe United, Laird signed for newly promoted League Two club Forest Green Rovers on 20 June 2017, joining on a two-year contract. He made his Forest Green debut at the start of the 2017–18 season, in the club's first ever Football League fixture, a 2–2 home draw with Barnet on 5 August 2017. Laird scored his first goal for Forest Green in a 2–0 win over Morecambe on 20 October 2017, doubling Forest Green's lead with a second-half free-kick. He made 43 appearances in all competitions during the club's first season in League Two, scoring three times.

Having made just one appearance for Forest Green during the first half of the 2018–19 season, Laird rejoined League One club Walsall on loan on 17 January 2019. He made his second debut two days later as an 80th-minute substitute in a 3–0 away victory at Gillingham. Laird made seven appearances during the loan spell. He was released by Forest Green Rovers at the end of the 2018–19 season.

Weston-super-Mare
Following his departure from Forest Green, Laird joined Southern League Premier Division South club Weston-super-Mare in a player-assistant manager role on 15 June 2019. He made his Weston-super-Mare debut in the club's opening game of the 2019–20 season, playing the whole match in a 2–2 draw against Hendon on 10 August 2019. Three days later, Laird scored his first goal for the club, an injury-time penalty to secure Weston-super-Mare a point in a 1–1 away draw at Merthyr Town. He scored his first career hat-trick in a 6–0 victory over Dorchester Town on 12 October 2019. Laird scored 13 times in 30 appearances from a central midfield role before the season was curtailed in March 2020 due to the COVID-19 pandemic.

International career
Despite being born in England, Laird represented Scotland at youth level, captaining the Scotland under-16 team all the way up to under-20 level on 30 occasions. He played in all three of Scotland's games in the Victory Shield in 2003, scoring twice, with Scotland finishing as joint winners of the tournament alongside England. He played 36 times across various age groups for Scotland, scoring six goals.

Laird was called up by Paul Fairclough for the England C team in April 2009, and subsequently started in England's 1–0 defeat to Belgium under-21 on 19 May 2009.

Style of play
Laird grew up playing as a left-sided centre-back, before being deployed in central midfield in the early stages of his career. He began playing at left-back at the start of his time at Stevenage, a position he would ultimately play at for the majority of his professional career. Described as a "marauding, attacking full-back", Laird reached double figures in combined goals and assists in five consecutive seasons from 2008 to 2013. After breaking his leg in November 2012, Laird stated he was "never the same player" on his return from injury as he had "lost that injection of pace". He returned to playing in a central midfield role upon playing semi-professionally at Weston-super-Mare.

Personal life
Laird's father, Craig, was a football manager before becoming a college teacher, having previously managed Bridgwater Town, Weston-super-Mare and Dorchester Town. He has three brothers, Craig, Jamie and Callum. Craig played soccer at the University of Tampa and also represented England at schoolboy level, whilst both Jamie and Callum have played semi-professional football. Laird's grandmother gave him a one pound coin every time he scored a goal.

Career statistics

Honours
Stevenage
Conference Premier: 2009–10
FA Trophy runner-up: 2009–10
Football League Two play-offs: 2010–11

Preston North End
Football League One play-offs: 2014–15

Individual
Stevenage Borough Player of the Year: 2009–10
Conference Premier Team of the Year: 2009–10

See also
List of sportspeople who competed for more than one nation

References

External links
 (data is incomplete for the 2006–07, 2008–09, and 2009–10 seasons)

Living people
1988 births
Sportspeople from Taunton
Footballers from Somerset
English footballers
England semi-pro international footballers
Scottish footballers
Scotland youth international footballers
Association football defenders
Plymouth Argyle F.C. players
Tiverton Town F.C. players
Torquay United F.C. players
Stevenage F.C. players
Preston North End F.C. players
Scunthorpe United F.C. players
Walsall F.C. players
Forest Green Rovers F.C. players
Weston-super-Mare A.F.C. players
Southern Football League players
National League (English football) players
English Football League players
English people of Scottish descent